Paul Williams (born 1964) is an Irish media personality and writer on crime.

His TV credits include Dirty Money and the self-regarding title Paul Williams Investigates—The Battle for the Gas Fields.

In 2011 he joined the Irish Sun, where he is employed as "Investigations Editor", after the closure of the Irish News of the World.

He previously worked for the Sunday World tabloid newspaper; he moved to the Irish News of the World  in 2010 before it was caught up in the News International phone hacking scandal and shut down.

Education
Williams was first educated in Ballinamore and then in Carrigallen (both in County Leitrim). He moved to Dublin in 1984 to study journalism at the Rathmines School of Journalism but dropped out after one year.

Personal life
Paul Williams is married to wife, Ann, with whom he has two teenage children.

In popular culture
Williams has been satirised as Paul 'The Hack' Williams on Oliver Callan's Nob Nation sketches on RTÉ Radio.

While on Liveline, Williams denied attempting to link the Republican movement with the criminal underworld. This prompted several people, whom Williams had linked to crime in his articles, to phone in and tell Joe Duffy that Williams was always making false allegations against them. Williams attempted to deflect the questions by focusing on their time spent in prison and implying that they had therefore lost any right to a reputation. In 2010, Williams contradicted himself by telling an audience that the Republican movement was linked with organised crime, so much so, he claimed, somewhat uncertainly, that 1969 was "probably the last truly peaceful year in this nation of ours. That", he said, "changed with the escalation of problems in Northern Ireland."

Books
Williams pens books with titles like Gangland (1998), Evil Empire (2001), Crimelords (2003), The Untouchables (2006), Crime Wars (2008), and Badfellas (2011).

His notorious 2014 book (titled Murder Inc) prompted objections and calls for a boycott from disgusted residents of Limerick when he attempted to do a signing there. A local bookstore owner posted a letter online saying he had never before had a visiting writer stir up so much anger from the public. Barrister and politician Emmett O'Brien, speaking on radio following Williams's self-promotional appearance on The Late Late Show, said the same crime stories are continually being "rehashed" and that Williams declined to mention any positive development, i.e. a decline in the city's murder rate. Photographer Darren Ryan said of Williams: "He's making a personal profit off the misery that the good citizens of Limerick have had to endure."

Williams also ghost-wrote the book Secret Love (1995) with Phylis Hamilton; this tells the story of her secret 20-year love affair with Ireland's most outspoken Catholic priest on issues of sexual morality, Fr. Michael Cleary. Hamilton, who worked as Fr. Cleary's housekeeper, had two sons with the celebrity cleric.

Television
Dirty Money: The Story of the Criminal Assets Bureau, a six-part TV series on the history of the Criminal Assets Bureau by Paul Williams, began in January 2008 on TV3; it won Best Documentary at that year's TV Now Awards.

In Paul Williams Investigates—The Battle for the Gas Fields aired in June 2009 on TV3, Williams reported on the Corrib gas controversy. Campaigners who protest the Corrib gas project argued the documentary was biased in favour of Royal Dutch Shell – the title itself shows that the "battle" is "for" the gas fields. Irish Independent reviewer John Boland also criticised Williams' obvious bias – "instead of providing an exposé [Williams] contented himself with innuendo and abuse", while "At the outset, he disingenuously asked if these 'vocal underdogs' were national heroes or 'villains' standing in the way of national progress, but he himself had no doubt about the answer, his attitude announcing itself in the language he used". The Irish Times reporter Frank McDonald reported that the documentary failed to explain the Shell's aims to Sea protesters. . Complaints were made to the Broadcasting Complaints Commission but were rejected on the grounds that the broadcast gave a fair opportunity for both sides to have their say.

Journalism
Williams has been the subject of criticism that he is a mouthpiece for the gardaí "who use his column to shape the public perception of the criminals he writes about and, quite possibly, to stir up tensions between rival gangs and major league villains". The Sunday Tribune said a common criticism of Williams is that he is "little more than a cheerleader for the gardaí" and noted Williams's tendency to steer away from any crime or corruption within the force.

Williams has been criticised for his tendency to give nicknames such as "The Tosser", "The Penguin", "Babyface" and "Fatpuss" to the criminals he is reporting on. Critics complain this has served to glamourise the criminals and to boost their public profile.

Williams has been the recipient of several death threats from organised crime and terrorist groups and has been receiving armed Garda protection for several years. The cost of this to the tax payer has been heavily criticised. On 16 March 2007, a man was acquitted at the Dublin Circuit Criminal Court of "threatening to kill or cause serious harm" to Paul Williams. The jury of four men and seven women deliberated for just one hour and thirty minutes to acquit Walsh on both charges on the sixth day of the trial.

Sunday World
After the murder of noted crime correspondent Veronica Guerin in 1996, Williams took over the mantle of Sunday World  reporting on what he considered to be some of Ireland's most notorious criminals, i.e. people like Martin Cahill (whom he nicknamed "The General"). The General was made into a 1998 movie directed by John Boorman. His articles appear weekly there where, according to the newspaper's website, he maintained a vast archive of background material. However, Williams's life's work has now been lost – the newspaper deleted it after he left.

In April 2000, the Sunday World defamed a man who gave evidence in the murder trial of Catherine Nevin, falsely stating the witness offered to sell photographs to Williams. The witness said the article also defamed him by claiming he "bragged about his sexual prowess" to Williams. The article also unsuccessfully tried to falsely link the witness to Martin Cahill and the Dublin/Monaghan bombings. Sunday Newspapers Ltd, trading as the Sunday World, asked the High Court to dismiss the witnesses lawsuit, citing the length of time that had passed since the incident; the judge granted the tabloid's application.

In 2002, Williams and the Sunday World were sued for libel after a story he had written in 1999 was proved to be untrue. In the article, Williams claimed a nun named Nora Wall had procured children so that they could be raped by paedophile priest Brendan Smyth. The paper issued a full apology and was forced to pay a €175,000 settlement to Ms. Wall.

In 2008, the Sunday Tribune reported that "his stories these days almost take second place to his personal celebrity" and that "friends say that he is only too aware of this and has renegotiated his contract throughout the years to reflect his market value".

News of the World
After receiving what he described as "a substantial offer" thought to involve a €250,000 salary, Williams left the Sunday World, where he had worked for 23 years, in January 2010, and joined the Irish "News of the World" as its crime editor. However, the Sunday World took out a High Court injunction in an effort to prevent him from taking up his new position until his three months' notice to leave had expired. The dispute was later settled.

His Sunday World contract had seen Williams paid a salary of a paltry €145,000, increased by 2.5 per cent in 2008 and 2009.

Irish Sun
He joined stablemate the Irish Sun in October 2011.

Irish Independent
Since 2012, he has contributed to the Irish Independent. There, availing of the title "Special Correspondent", he writes of thieves and burglaries.

TD Joan Collins named Williams under Dáil privilege as one of those to benefit from having their penalty points cancelled by gardaí. Establishment politicians and media reacted with fury – at Collins. After Garda Commissioner Martin Callinan's 2014 resignation in disgrace, Collins criticised the "Pauls" (Williams and his RTÉ counterpart Reynolds) and called on them to also resign their positions.

Radio
In 2016 Williams joined the newly revamped Newstalk breakfast show as a co-presenter.

References

1964 births
20th-century Irish people
21st-century Irish people
Living people
Irish journalists
Irish non-fiction writers
Irish male non-fiction writers
People from County Leitrim
News of the World people
The Sun (United Kingdom) people